Stanley Langshaw (1901–1936) was an English professional rugby league footballer who played in the 1920s. It was reported in November 1936 that he had died, aged 35, in hospital after a long illness.

International honours 
Stanley Langshaw won a cap for England while at Rochdale Hornets in 1925 against Wales.

References 

1901 births
1936 deaths
England national rugby league team players
English rugby league players
Rochdale Hornets players
Rugby league wingers
Rugby league players from Wigan